Eduard Ambrosis dze Shevardnadze (25 January 1928 – 7 July 2014) was a Soviet and Georgian politician and diplomat who governed Georgia for several non-consecutive periods from 1972 until his resignation in 2003 and also served as the final Soviet Minister of Foreign Affairs from 1985 to 1990.

Shevardnadze started his political career in the late 1940s as a leading member of his local Komsomol organisation. He was later appointed its Second Secretary, then its First Secretary. His rise in the Georgian Soviet hierarchy continued until 1961 when he was demoted after he insulted a senior official. After spending two years in obscurity, Shevardnadze returned as a First Secretary of a Tbilisi city district, and was able to charge the Tbilisi First Secretary at the time with corruption. His anti-corruption work quickly garnered the interest of the Soviet government and Shevardnadze was appointed as First Deputy of the Ministry of Internal Affairs of the Georgian SSR. He would later become the head of the internal affairs ministry and was able to charge First Secretary (leader of Soviet Georgia) Vasil Mzhavanadze with corruption.

He served as First Secretary of the Georgian Communist Party (GPC) from 1972 to 1985, which made him the de facto leader of Georgia. As First Secretary, Shevardnadze started several economic reforms, which would spur economic growth in the republican uncommon occurrence in the Soviet Union because the country was experiencing a nationwide economic stagnation. Shevardnadze's anti-corruption campaign continued until he resigned from his office as First Secretary.

In 1985, Mikhail Gorbachev appointed Shevardnadze to the post of Minister of Foreign Affairs. He served in this position, with the exception of a brief interruption between 1990 and 1991, until the fall of the Soviet Union. During this time, only Gorbachev would outrank Shevardnadze in importance in Soviet foreign policy. Shevardnadze was responsible for many key decisions in Soviet foreign policy during the Gorbachev Era, and was seen by the outside world as the face of Soviet reforms such as Perestroika.

In the aftermath of the Soviet Union's collapse in 1991, Shevardnadze returned to the newly independent Republic of Georgia, after being asked to lead the country by the Military Council which had recently deposed the country's first president, Zviad Gamsakhurdia. In 1992 Shevardnadze became the leader of Georgia (as Chairman of Parliament). He was formally elected as president in 1995. Under his rule, the peace treaty was signed in Sochi, which ended military hostilities in South Ossetia, although Georgia lost effective control over large part of the territory. In August 1992 the war broke out in Abkhazia, which Georgia also lost. Shevardnadze also headed the government in the civil war in 1993 against pro-Gamsakhurdia forces, which did not recognize Shevardnadze as a legitimate leader and tried to regain power. Shevardnadze signed Georgia up to the Commonwealth of Independent States, in return receiving help from Russia to end the conflict, although Georgia also deepened its ties with the European Union and the United States. It joined the Council of Europe in 1999 and declared its intention to join NATO in 2002. Shevardnadze oversaw large-scale privatization and other political and economic changes. His rule was marked by rampant corruption and accusations of nepotism. Allegations of electoral fraud during the 2003 legislative election led to a series of public protests and demonstrations colloquially known as the Rose Revolution. Eventually, Shevardnadze agreed to resign. He later published his memoirs and lived in relative obscurity until his death in 2014.

Early life and career
Eduard Shevardnadze was born on 25 January 1928, in Mamati in the Transcaucasian SFSR, which was a constituent republic of the Soviet Union. His father Ambrose was a teacher and a devoted communist and party official. His mother had little respect for the communist government and opposed both Shevardnadze's and his father's party careers.  Eduard was a cousin of the Georgian painter and intellectual Dimitri Shevardnadze, who was purged under Joseph Stalin. In 1937, during the Great Purge, his father was arrested but was later released because of the intervention of an NKVD officer who had been Ambrose's pupil.

In 1948 at the age of twenty, Shevardnadze joined the Georgian Communist Party (GCP) and the Communist Party of the Soviet Union (CPSU). He rose steadily through the ranks of the Georgian Komsomol and after serving a term as Second Secretary, he became its First Secretary. During his Komsomol First Secretaryship, Shevardnadze met Mikhail Gorbachev for his first time. Shevardnadze said he grew disillusioned with the Soviet political system following Nikita Khrushchev's "Secret Speech" to the 20th CPSU Congress. Like many Soviet people, Shevardnadze was horrified by the crimes perpetrated by Joseph Stalin, and the Soviet government's response to the 1956 Georgian demonstrations shocked him even more. He was demoted in 1961 by the Politburo of the Georgian Communist Party after offending a senior official.

After his demotion Shevardnadze endured several years of obscurity before returning to attention as a First Secretary of a city district in Tbilisi. Shevardnadze challenged Tbilisi First Secretary Otari Lolashvili, and later charged him with corruption. Shevardnadze left party work after his appointment as First Deputy of the Ministry of Internal Affairs of the Georgian SSR in 1964. It was his successful attempt at jailing Lolashvili, which got him promoted to the post of First Deputyship. In 1965, Shevardnadze was appointed Minister of Internal Affairs of the Georgian SSR. After initiating a successful anti-corruption campaign supported by the Soviet government, Shevardnadze was voted as Second Secretary of the Georgian Communist Party. Shevardnadze's anti-corruption campaign increased public enmity against him. However, these campaigns garnered the interest of the Soviet government, and in turn, his promotion to the First Secretaryship after Vasil Mzhavanadze's resignation.

In 1951, Shevardnadze married Nanuli Shevardnadze, whose father was killed by the authorities at the height of the purge. At first, Nanuli rejected Shevardnadze's marriage proposal, fearing that her family background would ruin Shevardnadze's party career. These fears were well justified; many other couples died for the same reason. Between 25 July 1972 and 29 September 1972,  Shevardnadze served the First secretary of the Tbilisi City Committee of the Communist Party of Georgia.

First Secretary of the GCP (1972–85)

Shevardnadze was appointed to the First Secretaryship of the Georgian Communist Party by the Soviet government; he was tasked with suppressing the grey and black-market capitalism that had grown under his predecessor Vasil Mzhavanadze's rule.

Anti-corruption campaigns
Shevardnadze's rapid rise in Soviet Georgia's political hierarchy was the result of his campaign against corruption. Throughout most of Shevardnadze's leadership, anti-corruption campaigns were central to his authority and policy. By the time Shevardnadze had become leader, Georgia was the Soviet republic most afflicted by corruption. The rule of Vasil Mzhavanadze had been characterised by weak leadership, nepotism, despotism, and bribery pervading the upper echelons of power. In Georgia, corruption had been allowed to thrive, leading to serious deformations in the system; for example only 68 per cent of Georgian goods were exported legally, while the percentage of goods exported legally from other Soviet Republics approached 100 per cent. Shevardnadze rallied support for his anti-corruption campaigns by establishing the Study of Public Opinion. To combat corruption, he engaged in subterfuge; after halting all exports he dressed himself as a peasant and drove a car filled with tomatoes through the border. After his personal subterfuge, the entire Georgian border police was purged. While never proven, it is said that after taking office, Shevardnadze asked all leading officials to show their left hands and ordered those who used Western-produced watches to replace them with Soviet ones. This story portrayed Shevardnadze as an active battler against corruption. His campaign against corruption was largely unsuccessful and when he returned to Georgia in 1992, corruption was still a huge problem.

Economic policy
Under Shevardnadze's rule, Georgia was one of several Soviet Republics that did not experience economic stagnation, instead experiencing rapid economic growth. By 1974, industrial output had increased by 9.6 per cent and agricultural output had increased by 18 per cent. The shortage economy, which had evolved into a prevalent problem in other parts of the Soviet Union, had nearly disappeared in Georgia. Long food queues in Tbilisi had shortened while those in Moscow had lengthened. Some of Shevardnadze's economic policies were adopted nationally by the Soviet government.

In 1973, Shevardnadze launched an agricultural reform in Abasha, popularly referred to as the "Abasha experiment". This reform was inspired by János Kádár's agricultural policy in Hungarian People's Republic, which returned agricultural decision-making to the local level of governance. Shevardnadze merged all Abasha agricultural institutions into a single entity and established a new remuneration system. If a farmer fulfilled the five-year plan early, he would be awarded a share of the crops. The policy had a positive effect on the Georgian economy and because of the large increase of agricultural output in Abasha, the reform was introduced elsewhere in the republic. The agricultural reform in Georgia became the model of the nationwide Agricultural-Industrial Organisations established by a decree in 1982.

Shevardnadze took much of the credit for Georgia's economic performance under his rule. Seven months before his promotion to the Soviet Foreign Affairs Ministership, Shevardnadze said there were thirty or more economic experiments operating in Georgia, which he said would further democratise the economic management.

Political experimentation and nationalism
Shevardnadze was a strong supporter of political reform in the Georgian SSR. He created agencies attached to the Central Committee of the Georgian Communist Party whose main task was studying, analysing and moulding public opinion. These agencies worked closely with Georgia's communications networks and media; government ministers and Shevardnadze were regularly interviewed live on television. Shevardnadze criticised flattery in Georgia and said he and his government's activities needed to be criticised more often, especially during party congresses. He showed himself, even before Mikhail Gorbachev's rise to power, to be a firm supporter of people's democracyi.e. power from below.

Previous Soviet Georgian rulers had given in to nationalist favouritism to the Georgians; Shevardnadze was against this policy of favouritism. Therefore, his nationalistic policy is considered controversial in Georgia. At the 25th Congress of the Georgian Communist Party, Shevardnadze told the congress, "for Georgians, the sun rises not in the east, but in the northin Russia". Shevardnadze saw "extreme nationalism", coupled with corruption and inefficiencies within the system, as one of the main obstacles to economic growth. During his rule he condemned what he considered "national narrow-mindedness and isolation" and writers who published works with nationalistic overtones. The 1970s saw an increase in nationalistic tendencies in Georgian society. The 1978 Georgian demonstrations were sparked by the Soviet government's decision to amend the Georgian constitution and remove the Georgian language as the sole state language in the republic. While at first standing firm with the Soviet government, Shevardnadze quickly reiterated his position and was able to compromise with the Soviet government and the demonstrators. The Georgian language was kept as the sole official language of the republic and the Supreme Soviet of the Soviet Union passed legislation calling for an increasing level of Russian language training in the non-Russian republics.

There was another problem facing Shevardnadze during the 1978 demonstrations; some leading Abkhaz intellectuals were writing to Leonid Brezhnev in the hope that he would let the Abkhaz Autonomous Soviet Socialist Republic secede from Georgia and merge into the Russian SFSR. To halt this development, the Georgian government gave way to concessions made by the secessionists that included establishing an Abkhaz university, the expansion of Abkhaz publications and creating an Abkhaz television station. Shevardnadze proved to be an active supporter of defending minority interests.

National politics and resignation
At the 25th Congress of the Communist Party of the Soviet Union (CPSU) in 1976, Shevardnadze gave a speech in which he called general secretary Leonid Brezhnev "vozhd" (leader), a term previously reserved for Joseph Stalin. His adulation was only surpassed by that of Andrei Kirilenko and Heydar Aliyev. As Yegor Ligachev later said, Shevardnadze never contradicted a general secretary. During Brezhnev's last days, Shevardnadze publicly endorsed Konstantin Chernenko's candidature for the General Secretaryship and called him a "great theoretician". However, when it became clear that the secretaryship would not go to Chernenko but to Yuri Andropov, Shevardnadze swiftly revised his position and gave his support to Andropov. Shevardnadze became the first Soviet republican head to offer his gratitude to the newly elected leader; in turn, Andropov quickly signalled his appreciation and his support for some of the reforms pioneered by Shevardnadze. According to Andropov's biographers the anti-corruption drive he launched was inspired by Shervardnadze's Georgian anti-corruption campaign. When Andropov died, Shevardnadze again became an avid supporter of Chernenko's candidature for the General Secretaryship.

When Chernenko died, Shevardnadze became a strong supporter of Mikhail Gorbachev's leadership candidature. Shevardnadze became a member of the Central Committee (CC) of the CPSU in 1976, and in 1978 was promoted to the rank of non-voting candidate member of the Soviet Political Bureau (Politburo). His chance came in 1985, when the veteran Soviet Minister of Foreign Affairs Andrei Gromyko left that post for the largely ceremonial position of Chairman of the Presidium of the Supreme Soviet of the Soviet Union (official head of state). The de facto leader, Communist Party general secretary Mikhail Gorbachev, appointed Shevardnadze to replace Gromyko as Minister of Foreign Affairs, thus consolidating Gorbachev's circle of relatively young reformers.

Minister of Foreign Affairs of the Soviet Union (1985–91)

Shevardnadze was a close ally of Gorbachev and was a strong advocate of the reform policies of glasnost and perestroika. He subsequently played a key role in the détente that marked the end of the Cold War. He negotiated nuclear arms treaties with the United States.  He helped end the war in Afghanistan, allowed the reunification of Germany, and withdrew Soviet forces from Eastern Europe and from the Chinese border.  He earned the nickname "The Silver Fox".

During the late 1980s as the Soviet Union descended into crisis, Shevardnadze became increasingly unpopular and was in conflict with Soviet hard-liners who disliked his reforms and his soft line with the West. He criticised a campaign by Soviet troops to put down an uprising in his native Georgia in 1989. In protest over the growing influence of hardliners under Gorbachev, Shevardnadze suddenly resigned in December 1990, saying,  "Dictatorship is coming". A few months later, his fears were partially realised when an unsuccessful coup by Communist hardliners precipitated the collapse of the Soviet Union. Shevardnadze returned briefly as Soviet Foreign Minister in November 1991 but resigned with Gorbachev the following month, when the Soviet Union was formally dissolved.

In 1991, Shevardnadze was baptized into the Georgian Orthodox Church.

President of Georgia (1995–2003)

Rise to power
The newly independent Republic of Georgia elected as its first president a leader of the national liberation movement, Zviad Gamsakhurdiaa scientist and writer who had been imprisoned by Shevardnadze's government in the late 1970s. However, Gamsakhurdia's rule ended abruptly in January 1992, when he was deposed in a bloody coup d'état.  Shevardnadze was appointed Speaker of the Georgian parliament in March 1992 and as speaker of parliament in November; both of these posts were equivalent to that of president. When the presidency was restored in November 1995, he was elected with 70% of the vote. He secured a second term in April 2000 in an election that was marred by widespread claims of vote-rigging.

Rule

Shevardnadze's career as Georgian President was in some respects more challenging than his earlier career as Soviet Foreign Minister. He faced many enemies, some dating back to his campaigns against corruption and nationalism during Soviet times. A civil war between supporters of Gamsakhurdia and Shevardnadze broke out in western Georgia in 1993 but was ended by Russian intervention on Shevardnadze's side and the death of ex-President Gamsakhurdia on 31 December 1993. Shevardnadze survived three assassination attempts in 1992, 1995, and 1998. He escaped a car bomb in Abkhazia in 1992.  In August 1995, he survived another car bomb attack outside the parliament building in Tbilisi.  In 1998, his motorcade was ambushed by 10 to 15 armed men; two bodyguards were killed.

Shevardnadze also faced separatist conflicts in the regions of South Ossetia and Abkhazia.  The war in the Russian republic of Chechnya on Georgia's northern border caused considerable friction with Russia, which accused Shevardnadze of harbouring Chechen guerrillas and in apparent retaliation supported Georgian separatists. Further friction was caused by Shevardnadze's close relationship with the United States, which saw him as a counterbalance to Russian influence in the strategic Transcaucasus region. Under Shevardnadze's strongly pro-Western administration, Georgia became a major recipient of U.S. foreign and military aid, signed a strategic partnership with NATO and declared an ambition to join both NATO and the European Union.

At the same time, Georgia suffered badly from the effects of crime and rampant corruption, which were often perpetrated by well-connected officials and politicians. Although Shevardnadze himself was not personally corrupt and lived a fairly modest life, he was increasingly unwilling or unable to tackle corruption at the highest levels. All his closest advisers, including several members of his family, exerted disproportionate economic power and became visibly wealthy. Transparency International's corruption index listed Georgia as one of the most corrupt countries in the world.

According to Spanish prosecutor José Grinda González, Georgian mafia led by Dzhaba Iosselani during the 1990s took control of the country and state and then later led by Zakhariy Kalashov during Shevardnadze's rule. Since April 2006, Khachidze or Lasha Shushanashvilialso imparted influence on Georgia as well as Tariel Oniani from Kutaisi near South Abkazia.

Downfall

On 2 November 2003, Georgia held a parliamentary election that was widely denounced as unfair by international election observers. The outcome sparked fury among many Georgians, leading to mass demonstrations in Tbilisi and elsewhere, called the Rose Revolution.  Protesters broke into parliament on 22 November as the first session of the new Parliament was beginning, forcing President Shevardnadze to escape with his bodyguards. On 23 November, Shevardnadze met with the opposition leaders Mikheil Saakashvili and Zurab Zhvania to discuss the situation in a meeting arranged by Russian Foreign Minister Igor Ivanov. After this meeting, Shevardnadze announced his resignation, declaring that he wished to avert a bloody power struggle "so all this can end peacefully and there is no bloodshed and no casualties". Shevardnadze's resignation as President of Georgia was the end of his political career.

Death and funeral
Shevardnadze spent his last years living quietly at his mansion house in the outskirts of Tbilisi. As his health deteriorated, his involvement in public life became much reduced. After a long illness, he died at the age of 86 on 7 July 2014.

Georgia's Former president Giorgi Margvelashvili and Prime Minister Irakli Garibashvili extended condolences to his family members. Margvelashvili described him as "one of the distinguished politicians of the 20th century, who participated in dismantling of the Soviet system". He added, "He was also playing a serious role in creation of new Georgia and in development of our western course". Garibashvili said Shevardnadze's "contribution was especially important in establishing Georgia's geopolitical role in the modern world. Eduard Shevardnadze was a politician of international significance, who made a great contribution to end the Cold War and to establish new world order." Former President Mikheil Saakashvili, who overthrew Shevardnadze in the 2003 Rose Revolution, offered condolences and said Shevardnadze was "a significant figure for the Soviet empire and for post-Soviet Georgia". Saakashvili said his government did not start a criminal prosecution against Shevardnadze, despite calls by some politicians and parts of society, out of "respect to the President's institution".

Among others, Russian President Vladimir Putin and U.S. Secretary of State John Kerry offered condolences. Kerry credited Shevardnadze with playing "an instrumental role" in bringing about the end of the Cold War, a reduction of "the risk of nuclear confrontation" as the Soviet Union's Foreign Minister, ensuring "the sovereignty and territorial integrity of [Georgia] during the 1990s" as President of Georgia and putting the country "on its irreversible trajectory toward Euro-Atlantic integration".

Shevardnadze was accorded a state funeral on 13 July 2014, which was attended by the Georgian political leaders and foreign dignitaries, including the former US Secretary of State James Baker and former German Foreign Minister Hans-Dietrich Genscher. After a service at the Holy Trinity Cathedral of Tbilisi, Shevardnadze was buried next to his late wife Nanuli Shevardnadze at the Krtsanisi residence in Tbilisi.

Honours and awards

Honours

National honours
:
 1981 – Hero of Socialist Labour
 1981 –  Five Orders of Lenin
 1985 –  Order of the October Revolution
 1985 –  1st class Order of the Patriotic War 
 1985 –  Order of the Red Banner of Labour

Foreign honours
 1999 – : Order of Merit of the Federal Republic of Germany 
 1999 – : 1st class Order of Prince Yaroslav the Wise, for outstanding contribution to the development of co-operation between Ukraine and Georgia, to strengthen the friendship between the Ukrainian and Georgian peoples
 1999 – : First Class of the Order of the State of Republic of Turkey
 1999 – : Gold Olympic Order for the biggest merit in the development of world sport and Olympic field.
 1999 – : Grand Cross of the Order of the Redeemer 
 2000 – : Knight Grand Cross of the Order of St Michael and St George.
 2000 – : Istiglal Order  for his contributions to the development of Azerbaijan–Georgia relations and strategic co-operation between the states
 2000 – : Order of St. Mesrop Mashtots 
 2003 – : Order of Outstanding Merit

Honorary degrees

 In 1991, Shevardnadze received an honorary degree from Harvard University.
 In 1991, Shevardnadze received an honorary degree from Boston University.
 In 1997, Shevardnadze received an honorary degree from Baku State University.

Awards
 In 1993, Institute for East West Security Studies granted Shevardnadze with the award for his merit in ending cold war and liberation of the country.
 On July, 1999, National Democratic Institute (NDI) awarded him with the W. Averell Harriman Democracy Award for merit in the field of democracy and human rights.
 On July 2, 1997, Onassis Foundation awarded Shevardnadze with its prize for International Understanding and Social Achievement.

References
Notes

Bibliography

Further reading
Когда рухнул железный занавес. Встречи и воспоминания.Эдуард Шеварднадзе, экс-президент Грузии, бывший министр Иностранных дел СССР. Предисловие Александра Бессмертных. Translation from German to Russian. Russian license ("Als der Eiserne Vorhang zerriss", Peter W. Metzler Verlag, Duisburg 2007).
Als der Eiserne Vorhang zerriss - Begegnungen und Erinnerungen. Peter W. Metzler Verlag, Duisburg 2007 (German: revised, re-designed and expanded edition. Georgian "Pikri Tsarsulsa da Momawalze – Memuarebi", Tbilisi 2006). The German edition is the basis for all translations and editions. 
Kui raudne eesriie rebenes. Translation from German to Estonian. Estonian license ("Als der Eiserne Vorhang zerriss", Peter W. Metzler Verlag, Duisburg 2007). Olion, Tallinn, 2009. 
The Future Belongs To Freedom, by Edvard Shevardnadze, translated by Catherine A. Fitzpatrick
 Ostrovsky, Alexander (2011). Глупость или измена? Расследование гибели СССР. (Stupidity or treason? Investigation of the death of the USSR)  М.: Форум, Крымский мост-9Д, 2011. – 864 с. ISBN 978-5-89747-068-6.

External links and sources

BBC obituary
Foes of Georgian Leader Storm Into Parliament Building by Seth Mydans, from the New York Times Web Site.
Georgian Interior Minister Vows to Enforce State of Emergency on the Voice of America News Web Site.
People power forces Georgia leader out from BBC News online.	
MacKinnon, Mark. . Globe and Mail, 26 November 2003.
Russians in Baden-Baden
Inauguration of Eduard Shevardnadze (2000)

Presidents of Georgia
First Secretaries of the Georgian Communist Party
Speakers of the Parliament of Georgia
Leaders who took power by coup
Party leaders of the Soviet Union
1928 births
2014 deaths
Central Committee of the Communist Party of the Soviet Union members
Georgian Soviet Socialist Republic people
Politburo of the Central Committee of the Communist Party of the Soviet Union members
Rose Revolution
Union of Citizens of Georgia politicians
Politicians from Tbilisi
Members of the Georgian Orthodox Church
Eastern Orthodox Christians from Georgia (country)
Soviet diplomats
Soviet Ministers of Foreign Affairs
Soviet Georgian generals
Soviet Georgian MVD officials
Ninth convocation members of the Supreme Soviet of the Soviet Union
Tenth convocation members of the Supreme Soviet of the Soviet Union
Eleventh convocation members of the Supreme Soviet of the Soviet Union
Heroes of Socialist Labour
Honorary Knights Grand Cross of the Order of St Michael and St George
Grand Crosses Special Class of the Order of Merit of the Federal Republic of Germany
Recipients of the Order of Lenin
Recipients of the Order of Prince Yaroslav the Wise, 1st class
Recipients of the Istiglal Order
Soviet politicians
20th-century politicians from Georgia (country)
21st-century politicians from Georgia (country)